The Cấm River (Vietnamese: Sông Cấm) is a river in northern Vietnam. It is one of the shorter distributaries of the Thái Bình River but geographically important as Hai Phong, Vietnam's second largest port is located on the banks of this river.

Geography and hydrology
The start of the Cấm River is the confluence of the Kinh Môn River and a smaller stream, the Hàn, in Hải Dương Province. From there it flows southeasterly, turning more easterly at Hai Phong before entering the Gulf of Tonkin as a wide estuary  farther downstream.

The Cấm is subject to frequent silting, requiring regular dredging to accommodate ships of greater than 5,000 tons.

References
Vietnam Administrative Atlas, NXB Bản Đồ, 2004.

External links
 Cục đường sông Việt Nam
 Sông Cấm trên Website Hải Phòng

Rivers of Haiphong
Rivers of Hải Dương province
Gulf of Tonkin
Rivers of Vietnam